Fools' Parade is a 1971 American crime-drama period film directed by Andrew McLaglen, with top-billed stars James Stewart and George Kennedy, and second-tier stars Strother Martin, Kurt Russell, William Windom, Mike Kellin and Anne Baxter. It was based on the novel of the same name by Davis Grubb. The film is also known as Dynamite Man from Glory Jail.

Plot
In 1935, the one-eyed murderer Mattie Appleyard who refers to his obviously unmatched glass eye with the persona "Tighe" (James Stewart), bank robber Lee Cottrill (Strother Martin), and a young convict by the name of Johnny Jesus (Kurt Russell) are released on the same day from the West Virginia State Penitentiary, located in the fictional town of Glory. Appleyard is issued a check for $25,452.32 for his 40 years of prison work, an enormous amount in the Great Depression. The released prisoners Appleyard and Cottrill have been long planning to establish and work together in their own independent retail grocery store that is to be located in a distant West Virginia coal camp community that, to that time. is only served by a coal company store.

All three of the released men are escorted by prison Captain and Sunday School teacher "Doc" Council (George Kennedy) to the local train station in the fictional Glory, West Virginia. Sometime after departing from Glory on the train, Appleyard realizes that his check is only redeemable in person back at the local bank in Glory. Council has previously plotted with Glory banker Homer Grindstaff (David Huddleston) to ensure the check is never cashed and accepts a cash advance from Grindstaff for the anticipated killing of Appleyard, Cottrill and Johny Jesus. Council then tells Grindstaff that this blood money, in part, will go toward missionary funding and vacation bible school.

Council and his accomplices, Steve Mystic (Mike Kellin) and a "nice religious boy" and cracked ice-sucking radio singer by the name of Junior Kilfong (Morgan Paull), travel to another stop down the line in order to kill Appleyard, Cottrill, and Johnny Jesus at night. Mystic has previously told Kilfong at some point that Appleyard, Cottrill, and Johnny Jesus are all atheists, and somewhere at a depot down the line from Glory, the uncertain Kilfong asks Mystic to confirm to him that the three released prisoners are atheists.

Informed of the plot by guilt-ridden conductor Willis Hubbard (Robert Donner), the three former prisoners thwart the plan. Kilfong ends up shooting mining supply salesman Roy K. Sizemore (William Windom). Council kills the wounded Sizemore and places the blame on Appleyard, who escapes with Sizemore's supply of dynamite.

The next day, Council goes to the bank to update Grindstaff. As they talk, Appleyard walks in with some of the dynamite strapped to his chest and the remainder in a suitcase. Appleyard threatens to blow them all up "and half this city block" if the banker does not cash his check. Grindstaff reluctantly complies.

Appleyard and his friends, who followed him back to Glory, split up, planning to meet again later. While waiting at the rendezvous, Cottrill is talked into boarding a houseboat owned by a down-on-her-luck prostitute named Cleo (Anne Baxter) for a drink of whiskey. Also aboard is Chanty (Katherine Cannon), a sixteen-year-old whom Cleo has taken in, hoping to sell her virginity for $100.

Appleyard and Johnny show up, only to be tracked down by Council and his bloodhound. The three friends get away in a skiff, leaving behind the suitcase of dynamite. Johnny is worried about what Council will do to Chanty, so they turn around and go back after Council leaves.

Before leaving, Council has told Cleo about Appleyard's money. At gunpoint, Appleyard gives her the suitcase that she believes contains the money in exchange for Chanty. After they leave, Cleo tries to shoot the locked suitcase open and blows herself up. The fugitives are later trapped on a boxcar by Council. The train is a "fools' parade" as described by Appleyard, going nowhere beyond the local train yard. Luckily for them, guilt-ridden train conductor Willis Hubbard returns and helps them escape. However, he is too afraid of Council to tell the police what he knows.

Council, Mystic, and Kilfong track them to an abandoned house. Council decides he does not want to share the loot, so he kills his two confederates. He then shoots a window out, wounding Appleyard. Johnny throws a stick of dynamite at Council, only to have Council's bloodhound fetch it back. Appleyard hastily throws it out the window, killing Council.

The men are arrested and Appleyard's money confiscated, but Hubbard confesses the truth, and Grindstaff is arrested. Appleyard and his friends are exonerated, and Appleyard is allowed to cash his check.

Cast

James Stewart as Mattie Appleyard
George Kennedy as "Doc" Council
Anne Baxter as Cleo
Strother Martin as Lee Cottrill
Kurt Russell as Johnny Jesus
William Windom as Roy K. Sizemore
Mike Kellin as Steve Mystic
Katherine Cannon as Chanty
Morgan Paull as Junior Kilfong 
Robert Donner as Willis Hubbard
David Huddleston as Homer Grindstaff
James Lee Barrett as Sonny Boy
Dort Clark as Enoch Purdy
Kitty Jefferson Doepken as Clara
Dwight McConnell as Station Master
Richard Carl as Police Chief
Arthur Cain as Prosecuting Attorney

Production
Fools' Parade was filmed entirely in Marshall County, West Virginia. Davis Grubb, author of Fools' Parade, was born and raised in Moundsville, where most of the filming took place. The production crew used the Baltimore and Ohio Railroad throughout filming, mainly at the Moundsville station, which was demolished in 1980.

Reception
Tony Mastroianni of the Cleveland Press said it "leans heavily on Stewart's skill, personality and built-in folksiness. Time and again he gives you the impression of an interesting character that really isn't there in the role."

From the review in The Movie Scene: "James Stewart ... is central to the movie working, but it also features some nice and unexpected performances from the other stars such as Kurt Russell and George Kennedy. It also has a surprisingly good storyline which has a couple of layers of unexpected depth. Yet because some of it is played out for laughs it left me unsure...the light-hearted moments (seem) a bit strange..."

See also
 List of American films of 1971

References

Further reading
 AP Wirephoto (June 18, 1971). "Stewart Stars Again". Lancaster New Era. Page 21.

External links

Fools' Parade at TVGuide (1987 write-up was originally published in The Motion Picture Guide)

1971 films
1971 comedy-drama films
American comedy-drama films
American comedy thriller films
Columbia Pictures films
1970s English-language films
Films based on American novels
Films directed by Andrew McLaglen
Films set in 1935
Films set in West Virginia
Films shot in West Virginia
1970s comedy thriller films
1970s American films